Alcatel One Touch 990 is an Android 2.2 froyo touchscreen smartphone, from Alcatel One Touch series, phone has 5-megapixel camera with autofocus and LED flash. An off-line upgrade to 2.3 is available for many variants.

Specifications

Hardware
The Alcatel One Touch 990 has a 3.5-inch TFT capacitive touchscreen display, 150 MB of internal storage that can be expanded using microSD cards up to 32 GB. The phone has a 1300 mAh Li-Ion battery, 5 MP rear camera with a selfie camera. It is available in Bluish black, Auberguine, Spicy red colors.

Software
Alcatel On Touch 990 ships with Android 2.2 (Froyo).

Availability

Phone is available in Canada, Croatia, Georgia, Russia, Ukraine, Spain, Montenegro, Hungary, Serbia, Chile, Poland, United States, Australia, India, Dominican Republic.

References

External links 
 http://www.alcatelonetouch.com/global-en/products/smartphones/ot-990.html
 http://www.gsmarena.com/alcatel_ot_990-3799.php

Android (operating system) devices
Mobile phones introduced in 2011
Alcatel mobile phones